Live at the Apollo 1995 is a live album by James Brown. It was the fourth and final album he recorded at Harlem's Apollo Theater. Contrary to the title, it was recorded in 1994, 32 years after the original Live at the Apollo. It includes one studio track, "Respect Me".

Live at the Apollo 1995 was the last live album James Brown recorded.

Track listing

References

James Brown live albums
1995 live albums
Scotti Brothers Records albums